Fabio Bordonali (born 25 December 1963 in Brescia) is an Italian former road cyclist. Professional from 1985 to 1994, he most notably won the 1989 Vuelta a Andalucía. After retiring from cycling, he worked as a directeur sportif on several teams.

Major results
1986
 7th GP Industria & Artigianato di Larciano
1989
 1st  Overall Vuelta a Andalucía
1st Stage 1
1990
 1st Overall Cronostaffetta
1991
 2nd Overall Settimana Ciclistica Lombarda
 10th Trofeo Laigueglia

Grand Tour general classification results timeline

References

External links

1963 births
Living people
Italian male cyclists
Cyclists from Brescia